Brooklyn, Alabama may refer to the following places in Alabama:
Brooklyn, Coffee County, Alabama
Brooklyn, Conecuh County, Alabama
Brooklyn, Cullman County, Alabama